The Moscow International Automobile Salon or MIAS is the biennial auto show held at Crocus Expo in Moscow, Russia. The show is scheduled by the Organisation Internationale des Constructeurs d'Automobiles, which considers it a major international auto show. The organizers are the Association of Russian Carmakers NP and the Expo Centre. Numerous dealer conferences organized by car producers are forming the integral part of the program. In September 2010, it received the status of 'A' High Class Automobile Salon.

History

2006
The 2006 show was held from 30 August to 10 September.

2008
The 2008 show was held from 26 August to 7 September.

Introductions:
 Audi A6 (facelift)
 Audi RS6
 Citroën C4 I (facelift)
 Lexus LS460 AWD
 Mazda Kazamai Concept
 Mitsubishi Pajero Sport
 Renault Symbol

2010
The 2010 show was held from 25 August to 5 September.

Introductions:
 Ford Mondeo (facelift)
 Honda Crosstour (Russian introduction)
 Hyundai RB concept
 Hyundai Sonata (Russian introduction)
 Jaguar XJ Sentinel Armored Version
 Lada Priora 2011
 Lada Project R90
 Lexus RX 270
 Marussia F2
 Mitsubishi ASX (Russian introduction)
 Nissan Patrol (Russian introduction)
 Renault Latitude
 TagAZ B100 Concept
 TagAZ D100 Concept
 TagAZ Q100 Concept
 Toyota Highlander (facelift)
 Volkswagen Polo Sedan

2012
The 2012 show was held from 29 August to 9 September.

Introductions:

 Audi R8 (facelift)
 Besturn B50 (Russian introduction)
 Bentley Continental GT Speed
 BMW i8 Spyder (concept) (European introduction)
 BMW Zagato Coupe (concept) (Russian introduction)
 Cadillac ATS (Russian introduction)
 Cadillac CTS-V sedan/coupé (Russian introduction)
 Chevrolet Cobalt (European introduction)
 Chevrolet Colorado (European introduction)
 Chevrolet TrailBlazer (European introduction)
 Citroën C5 (facelift)
 Ford Evos (concept) (Russian introduction)
 Ford Kuga (Russian introduction)
 Geely Englon SC5 (Russian introduction)
 Geely Gleagle GX7 (Russian introduction)
 Honda EV-STER Concept (Russian introduction)
 Hyundai Equus Limousine Security
 Hyundai i30 Estate (Russian introduction)
 Hyundai i40 Estate (Russian introduction)
 Hyundai Santa Fe (European introduction)
 Infiniti JX (European introduction)
 Jaguar XF AWD
 Jaguar XFR Speed Pack
 Jaguar XJ AWD
 Kia Quoris (European introduction)
 Lada XRAY (concept)
 Lada Kalina
 EL Lada EV
 Land Rover Freelander 2 (facelift)
 Lexus ES (Russian introduction)
 Lexus LS (facelift)
 Lifan 720 (Russian introduction)
 Lifan Smiley (facelift) (Russian introduction)
 Lifan X60 (Russian introduction)
 Mazda6
Mercedes-Benz GL63 AMG
Nissan Almera
 Nissan Juke with Ministry of Sound edition
 Opel Astra (facelift)
 Opel Astra Sedan
 SEAT Toledo concept (Russian introduction)
 Škoda Yeti Sochi
 Suzuki Grand Vitara facelift (Europe introduction)

The Best Automobile of the Moscow International Automobile Salon’2012 was for the first time held within the frames of MIAS’2012. The Bentley Continental GT Speed was awarded the Car of Dream.

References

External links 

 MIAS Official website

Auto shows
Tourist attractions in Moscow